This is a list of notable nightclub fires at indoor and outdoor venues. Many involve pyrotechnic failures.

See also
 List of fires

References 

 
Nightclub